Delaware Avenue Historic District may refer to:
Delaware Avenue Historic District (Wilmington, Delaware)
Delaware Avenue Historic District (Buffalo, New York)